The Kalchykhttp://www.encyclopediaofukraine.com/display.asp?linkpath=pages%5CK%5CA%5CKalkaRiver.htm is a river in the Donetsk and Zaporizhzhia Oblast of Ukraine. It flows into the Kalmius, which it enters near the city of Mariupol. Supposedly it was the scene of the Battle of the Kalka River between the Mongol Empire and Kievan Rus' in 1223. It was also the scene of a smaller battle during a Mongol civil war in 1381.

References

Drainage basins of the Sea of Azov
Rivers of Donetsk Oblast